Baia de Aramă is a small Romanian town located in Mehedinți County, in the historical region of Oltenia, with a population of 5,349. The river Brebina runs through the town. Some Dacian ruins can be found in the town, as well as the 17th century Baia de Aramă Monastery.

The name of the town means "copper mine", suggesting that Baia de Aramă was once a strong copper mining town. However, over the years, many of the mines in the town have closed, leaving roughly half the town unemployed.

Eight villages are administered by the town: Bratilovu, Brebina, Dealu Mare, Mărășești, Negoești, Pistrița, Stănești and Titerlești.

References

Towns in Romania
Populated places in Mehedinți County
Localities in Oltenia